Denisovsky is a rural locality (a khutor) in Upornikovskoye Rural Settlement, Nekhayevsky District, Volgograd Oblast, Russia. The population was 143 as of 2010. There are 5 streets.

Geography 
Denisovsky is located 35 km southeast of Nekhayevskaya (the district's administrative centre) by road. Rechensky is the nearest rural locality.

References 

Rural localities in Nekhayevsky District